Peter Becker is an Anglo-German actor. He was born in 1979 in Bad Hersfeld to a German father and a British mother and was raised between Germany and the UK. Becker had his first role as a theatre actor at 15 years old at the renowned Bad Hersfelder Festspiele.

At the same time as he was building his acting career, Becker was simultaneously involved in journalism, rising to editor of the Hersfelder Zeitung newspaper’s weekly youth page.

After completing his formal education, Becker moved to Berlin, where he became a production assistant and casting director for commercials and music videos.

In 2002 he began studying at the prestigious Ernst Busch Academy of Dramatic Arts. During this time he was recruited for his first film roles (‘The Loss Of The Pamir’), and further theatre engagements including Deutsches Theater (Berlin) and Thalia Theater (Hamburg).
The short film ‘Es Geht Uns Gut’ by Thomas Stuber, on which he worked both as lead actor as well as co-author, won the Advancement Award of the Film Industry of Baden-Wuerttemberg in 2006 and received the title “valuable” by the Film Review Board Wiesbaden in 2007.
In addition to working in front of the camera (including 'Unknown (2011 film)’, 'Babylon Berlin', '13 Minutes', ‘Mission To Murder Hitler’ and ‘Bad Banks’) he is regularly performing on stage.

From 2006 to 2007, Becker became part of the ensemble at Volkstheater, Vienna where he met director Nuran David Calis, with whom he collaborated again in 2008 at Schauspiel Köln in Cologne.

In 2009, he returned to Berlin where he has since been involved in numerous productions at Ballhaus Naunynstrasse, Heimathafen Neukölln, HAU, Ballhaus Ost and  Maxim Gorki Theater.

In 2015 he played ‘Giselher of Burgundy’ at the Nibelung Festival, Worms and in 2017 he was cast as ‘Friedrich Müller’ in the highly acclaimed UK tour of ‘War Horse (play)’ that’s announced to be extended for a run at the Royal National Theatre to commemorate the 100th anniversary of the end of World War I in November 2018.

Besides acting, Becker works as a voice-over artist for clients including major German TV and radio stations such as Deutschlandfunk Kultur, Arte, ARD (broadcaster) and ZDF. He is also known for his portrayal of 'The Joker (character)' in the German version of Lego Batman 2: DC Super Heroes and Lego Batman 3: Beyond Gotham.

Filmography 

{| class="wikitable plainrowheaders sortable"
|+ Film / TV roles
! scope="col" | Year
! scope="col" | Title
! scope="col" | Role
! scope="col" class="unsortable" | Notes and awards
|-
! scope="row" | 2005
| The Loss of the Pamir
| Bernd 'Stummel' Ahlers
|
|-
! scope="row" | 2006
| Es geht uns gut
| Daniel Liedel
| Advancement Award of the film industry of Baden-WuerttembergTitle ‘Valuable’ by the Film Review Board Wiesbaden
|-
! scope="row" | 2006
| Im Namen des Gesetzes – Kinderlos
| Mark
|
|-
! scope="row" | 2007
| Unschuldig – Chaostage
|
|
|-
! scope="row" | 2007
| Far Too Close
| David
|
|-
! scope="row" | 2007
| Headshots
| Jan
|
|-
! scope="row" | 2008
| Mission to Murder Hitler (Stauffenberg – Die wahre Geschichte)
| Graf Schenk Claus von Stauffenberg

|
|-
! scope="row" | 2008
| Vulkan
| Patrick
|
|-
! scope="row" | 2008
| 
| Doctor
| Television Award of the German Academy of Performing Arts
|-
! scope="row" | 2008
| Liebe deinen Feind
| Corporal Marc Fletcher
|
|-
! scope="row" | 2009
| Der Mann der über Autos sprang
| Policeman
| Best Film at the Festival du Film d‘Aubagne
|-
! scope="row" | 2009
| A gURLs wURLd (Emmas Chatroom)
| Officer Warnke
|
|-
! scope="row" | 2009
| Until Nothing Remains (Bis nichts mehr bleibt)
| Lenny
|
|-
! scope="row" | 2010
| Unknown
| Hotel Guard
|
|-
! scope="row" | 2010
| Fluss
| Jörg
|
|-
! scope="row" | 2010
| Das Geschenk
| Old Shatterhand
| Advancement Award at the International Short Film Festival DresdenNomination for the Max Ophüls Award in the competition category ‘short film’
|-
! scope="row" | 2011
| Alles Klara – Mord nach Stundenplan
| Marc Höhne
|
|-
! scope="row" | 2012
| Polizeiruf 110 – Eine andere Welt
| Brandt
|
|-
! scope="row" | 2012
| Tatort – Schwarze Tiger, Weisse Löwen
| Sikter
|
|-
! scope="row" | 2012
| Frau Ella
| Patrice
|
|-
! scope="row" | 2013
| Dr. Gressmann zeigt Gefühle
| Steve
|
|-
! scope="row" | 2014
| 13 Minutes (Elser – Er hätte die Welt verändert)
| Lux
|
|-
! scope="row" | 2014
| Polizeiruf 110 – Eine mörderische Idee
| Sautter
|
|-
! scope="row" | 2014
| Stuttgart Homicide – Chain Reaction (SOKO Stuttgart – Kettenreaktion)
| Timo Münster
|
|-
! scope="row" | 2015
| SOKO Wismar – Tödliche Diagnose| Matthias Harthoff
|
|-
! scope="row" | 2015
| Immigration Game| Paul
|
|-
! scope="row" | 2016
| Ein starkes Team – Nathalie| Maximilian Förster (Arzt)
|
|-
! scope="row" | 2016
| Alarm für Cobra 11 – Die Autobahnpolizei – Phantom Code| Kiesling
|
|-
! scope="row" | 2016
| Babylon Berlin| Kapo Heinrich
|Deutscher Fernsehpreis for Best SeriesPremios Ondas for International Television: Best SeriesRomy (TV award) for TV Event Of The YearSeoul International Drama Awards, Grand PrizeShanghai International TV Festival for Best Foreign TV SeriesBavarian TV Awards, Special AwardBambi Award for TV NationalGrimme-Preis for Best FictionEuropean Film Awards for European Achievement in Fiction Series
|-
! scope="row" | 2016
| Bad Banks – The Lion's Den
| Matthias Wegener
| Deutscher Fernsehpreis for Best Series
|-
! scope="row" | 2017
| Der Zürich Krimi – Borchert und die letzte Hoffnung| Coroner
|
|-
! scope="row" | 2019
| Notruf Hafenkante – Pokerprinzessin
| Paul Anton
|
|-
! scope="row" | 2019
| Letzte Spur Berlin – Amöbenliebe
| Christoph Fahrenholz
|
|-
! scope="row" | 2019
| Blutige Anfänger 
| Roger Hahnemann
|

|}

 Selected stage credits 

 Friedrich Müller, War Horse (play), Royal National Theatre, UK Tour, 2017–2018
 Bailiff, Geheimdienste vor Gericht – Eine Volksbeschwerde, Maxim Gorki Theater, Berlin, 2016
 Mike, And Then We Took Berlin, Ballhaus Ost, Berlin, 2016–2017
 Giselher, Gemetzel, Nibelung Festival, Worms, 2015
 Ghassan, Could You Please Look Into The Camera!, Heimathafen Neukölln, Berlin, 2013–2014
 Isaac, Abraham And The Butchers, Ballhaus Naunynstrasse, Berlin, 2012–2013
 Ernst-Theodor Vorm Walde, Endstation Ewige Heimat, Heimathafen Neukölln, Berlin, 2011
 Foreign Worker, Lö Bal Almanya, Ballhaus Naunynstrasse, Berlin 2011–2013
 Emil, Waiting For Adam Spielman, Ballhaus Naunynstrasse, Berlin, 2010–2012
 Journalist, Die Schwäne Vom Schlachthof, Ballhaus Naunynstrasse, Berlin
 Karsten, Man Braucht Keinen Reiseführer Für Ein Dorf, Das Man Sieht, Hebbel am Ufer, Berlin, 2009
 Lepidus, Caligula, Deutsches Theater (Berlin), 2009
 Toni, Stunde Null Vol. I – III, Schauspiel Köln, Cologne, 2008
 Martius, Anatomy Titus: Fall of Rome, Grillo-Theater, Essen 2008
 Malcolm, Macbeth, Volkstheater, Vienna, 2006–2007
 Paul Danziger, On the Shore of the Wide World, Volkstheater, Vienna, 2006–2007
 Ernst Ludwig, Cabaret, Volkstheater, Vienna, 2006–2007
 Cyril, Yvonne, Princess Of Burgundy, Volkstheater, Vienna, 2006
 Bill, Dogville', Volkstheater, Vienna, 2006
 Percy 'Hotspur', Henry IV, Part 1', BAT, Berlin, 2005
 Ismael, Cold'', Deutsches Theater (Berlin), 2004–2006
 diverse productions, Bad Hersfelder Festspiele, 1995–1998

References 

War Horse in London mit Bad Hersfelder Schauspieler Peter Becker Hessische Niedersächsische Allgemeine, 4 November 2018
Peter Becker is currently starring in the UK Tour of War Horse and is the first German person to play Friedrich in the show. Rewrite This Story, 23 October 2017
In die Rolle des Widerstandskämpfers schlüpft der Schauspieler Peter Becker.
TV Spielfilm, 13 January 2009
ZDF macht Tom Cruises "Walküre" Konkurrenz
 Die Welt, 13 January 2009
Peter Becker in der Hauptrolle des Stauffenberg
Mitteldeutsche Zeitung, 13 January 2009
ZDF tritt mit Stauffenberg-Film gegen Tom Cruise an*Der Westen, 9 January 2009

External links 
 
 Peter Becker's Homepage

German male film actors
German male stage actors
1979 births
Living people
German male television actors
British male stage actors
German people of British descent
20th-century German male actors
21st-century German male actors
People from Bad Hersfeld